Hollywood Goes Krazy is a 1932 short animated film featuring the comic strip character Krazy Kat, as well as some caricatures of well-known actors of the time.

Plot
Krazy and his spaniel girlfriend are riding in a car, heading towards Hollywood to see if they can be movie stars.

When they reach the premises of the studio, Krazy tries to enter the office of the casting director but is quickly pushed out. He reenters but is still refused. The casting director emerges from the office and notices the spaniel. The casting director finds the spaniel interesting and takes her.

The casting director takes the spaniel to a couch in a sound stage where they sit down and chat. After treating her with cigars and wine, he shows her a contract which she finds interesting. But for some reason, the casting director menacingly picks up and holds the spaniel, prompting her to shout for help.

Krazy is still standing at the studio premises until he hears the spaniel's distress calls. He, however, needs to get past the guard who would not let him go further in the studio. He tries to disguise himself as Charlie Chaplin but the guard is not fooled. He then disguises himself as Groucho Marx but the guard is still not fooled. When a real actor (Eddie Cantor) tries to get through but is also being stopped by the guard, Krazy uses this as an opportunity to sneak pass. The guard still spots and pursues him.

On the run, Krazy tries to hide behind a house with removable parts, then behind Laurel and Hardy. But with a little help from the real Charlie Chaplin who is throwing pies, Krazy finally loses the guard.

Krazy, at last, reaches the sound stage where the spaniel is in trouble. Krazy lands punches, and knocks out the villainous casting director. It turns out the scene involving the spaniel and the casting director is part of a movie scene being shot. The director is not happy with Krazy's unwanted approach. The director then picks up and slams Krazy to the ground.

See also
 Krazy Kat filmography

Notes

References

External links
Hollywood Goes Krazy at The Big Cartoon DataBase
 

1932 films
American animated short films
American black-and-white films
1932 animated films
Krazy Kat shorts
Films about Hollywood, Los Angeles
Films set in Los Angeles
Cultural depictions of Laurel & Hardy
Cultural depictions of Charlie Chaplin
Columbia Pictures short films
1930s American animated films
Columbia Pictures animated short films
Screen Gems short films